This article lists the squads for the 2019 SheBelieves Cup, the 4th edition of the SheBelieves Cup. The cup consisted of a series of friendly games, and was held in the United States from 27 February to 5 March 2019. The four national teams involved in the tournament registered a squad of 23 players.

The age listed for each player is on 27 February 2019, the first day of the tournament. The club listed is the club for which the player last played a competitive match prior to the tournament. The nationality for each club reflects the national association (not the league) to which the club is affiliated. A flag is included for coaches that are of a different nationality than their own national team.

Squads

Brazil
Coach: Vadão

The final squad was announced on 21 February 2019.

England
Coach: Phil Neville

The final squad was announced on 19 February 2019. Jill Scott withdrew from the squad on 24 February 2019 to manage her fitness and was replaced with Chioma Ubogagu.

Japan
Coach: Asako Takakura

The final squad was announced on 15 February 2019. Rei Takenaka and Ayaka Saitō replaced Sakiko Ikeda and Ayaka Yamashita who withdrew due to injuries.

United States
Coach: Jill Ellis

The final squad was announced on 12 February 2019. Danielle Colaprico suffered a groin injury and was replaced by Emily Fox on 26 February 2020.

Player representation

By club
Clubs with 3 or more players represented are listed.

By club nationality

By club federation

By representatives of domestic league

References

2019
2019 in American women's soccer
2019 in women's association football
2018–19 in English women's football
2019 in Japanese women's sport
2019 in Japanese football
2019 in Brazilian football
February 2019 sports events in the United States
March 2019 sports events in the United States
2019 in sports in Florida
2019 in sports in Pennsylvania
2019 in sports in Tennessee